The 1882 Rutgers Queensmen football team represented Rutgers University as an independent during the 1882 college football season. The Queensmen compiled a 6–4 record, scored 23 points, and allowed 23 points. The team had no coach, and its captain was William J. Chamberlain.

Schedule

References

Rutgers
Rutgers Scarlet Knights football seasons
Rutgers Queensmen football